Noordeinde is a town in the Dutch province of South Holland. It is a part of the municipality of Nieuwkoop, and lies about 10 km northeast of Alphen aan den Rijn.

In 2001, the town of Noordeinde had 561 inhabitants. The built-up area of the town was 0.12 km2, and contained 196 residences.

References
 

Populated places in South Holland
Geography of Nieuwkoop